My Kind of Christmas is the third studio album and first Christmas album by American singer Christina Aguilera. It was released on October 24, 2000, by RCA Records. The album was recorded from late 1999 to mid 2000, while Aguilera was touring to promote her first two albums: Christina Aguilera (1999) and Mi Reflejo (2000). My Kind of Christmas contains cover versions of Christmas standards, such as "Have Yourself a Merry Little Christmas" and "Angels We Have Heard on High", as well as several original recordings, which incorporate dance-pop elements. The album was produced by Ron Fair, the Matrix, Robbie Buchanan, Barry Harris and Chris Cox.

My Kind of Christmas received generally mixed reviews from music critics, who criticized its musical style and Aguilera's vocals. The album peaked at number 28 on the U.S. Billboard 200 and was certified platinum by the Recording Industry Association of America (RIAA), having sold 1,015,000 copies. Aguilera appeared on several television shows, such as The Early Show and The David Letterman Show, to promote the album, and also performed a special concert for ABC, which was released on DVD in June 2001, as My Reflection.

Background
Aguilera achieved success following the release of her first two studio albums, Christina Aguilera in 1999 and Mi Reflejo in late-2000 respectively, both of which were certified multi-platinum by the Recording Industry Association of America (RIAA). In 1999, Aguilera released a cover of "The Christmas Song" which found critical and commercial success peaking at number 18 on the US Billboard Hot 100 singles chart. Recording for My Kind of Christmas began from early to mid-2000, when Aguilera was touring to support her debut and Spanish-counterpart albums.

Composition

My Kind of Christmas is a Christmas and dance-pop album, which is made up of mainly cover versions of Christmas standards along with several new tracks. The album begins with two original songs. "Christmas Time" is a "catchy, upbeat, pop song, all about the Christmas season" and includes a rap from Aguilera towards the end. "This Year" was co-written by Aguilera and is a hip hop and R&B-infused song where "Aguilera sings about spending the holidays with her sweetheart in a typical xtina fashion".

This is followed by "Have Yourself a Merry Little Christmas", "Angels We Have Heard on High" and "Merry Christmas, Baby" which are the three soulful and gospel ballads from the album, backed by a 70-piece orchestra. Originally, Etta James was planned to be included as a featured performer on the track "Merry Christmas, Baby". However Dr. John was chosen instead. A portion of "Auld Lang Syne" is included at the beginning of "Merry Christmas, Baby" with some deeming the input to be unnecessary. Aguilera's cover of "O Holy Night" was received with mixed reviews with comparisons made to Mariah Carey's version. Aguilera recites The Lord's Prayer during the song which was called "awkward but nice". Wales Online called it one of "the absolute worst Christmas songs of all time".

"O Holy Night" is followed by Aguilera's cover of Celine Dion's "These Are the Special Times" from her album of the same name. Aguilera then covers Donny Hathaway's "This Christmas", which received praise for its originality. "The Christmas Song", previously released in late-1999 was also included in the album. This was followed by an interlude titled "Xtina's Xmas". The album ends with "The Christmas Song (Holiday Remix)" which was Aguilera's version of "The Christmas Song" remade as a dance-styled number by Thunderpuss who set the song to "a kicking dance beat".

Promotion
The album was released on October 24, 2000, by RCA Records as Aguilera's third studio album in the United States, following her two first albums Christina Aguilera (1999) and Mi Reflejo (2000). It was released as two formats: CD and cassette. In order to promote the album, Aguilera promoted the album on a number of shows, including The Rosie O'Donnell Show, The Early Show, and David Letterman Show. On December 10, 2000, Aguilera performed "The Christmas Song", "Genie in a Bottle" and "What a Girl Wants" during a concert at Franklin High in Milwaukee, being watched by 1,300 students. She also performed during an ABC special concert later in December; the set list included songs from her three first studio albums, including a song from My Kind of Christmas, "Have Yourself A Little Merry Christmas". There, she performed the track with Brian McKnight. The concert was filmed and released as a DVD entitled My Reflection (2001).

Singles
"The Christmas Song (Chestnuts Roasting On An Open Fire)" was the only song released as a single from the album. It was sent to Hot adult contemporary and adult contemporary radio stations on November 15, 1999, as well as receiving a commercial release on a compact disc. It was released alongside the "Thunderpuss 2000 Holiday Remix" and the Eddie Arroyo Rhythm Mix of "Genie in a Bottle". "The Christmas Song" became Aguilera's fifth top-twenty hit on the Billboard Hot 100, peaking at number 18 on the chart. Aguilera's version became the second highest position for the song in the chart after the original.

"Christmas Time" was released in December 2000 on a compact disc as a single. RCA released the song in the United States and BMG distributed it throughout Europe. A promotional live video was released as well.

Reception

Critical reception

The album garnered mixed reviews from music critics who criticized the production and Aguilera's vocal delivery. AllMusic editor Stephen Thomas Erlewine wrote that "none of the new songs are knockouts" but  the album was an "entertaining seasonal dance-pop" that "may not add too much to Christina's catalog" but "suggest that she may not be a mere one-album wonder." Chris Willman from Entertainment Weekly thought that "Aguilera oversings so wildly that there wouldn't have been enough oxygen in the booth to sustain another life form", and that Aguilera "is out of control here, spoiling some nifty modern arrangements with her exhausting insistence on making every other syllable an octave spanning tour de force." Jaan Uhelszki from Rolling Stone criticized the album as being "chilly, forced and overdone", and claimed that the album "is just another forum to showcase Aguilera’s formidable bag of vocal gymnastics and posturing without a shred of sincerity or warmth". The Atlanta Journal-Constitution was not impressed toward Aguilera's vocal ability on the album, giving it a mixed review. The Austin Chronicle writer Christopher Gray gave the album two stars noting that "Aguilera certainly has the pipes to outlast such jejune nonsense, but she's got to learn some subtlety first, and Christmas songs aren't exactly the best material to be practicing on".

Retrospective reception
In an ex post facto review, Billboard writer Taylor Weatherby noted in 2016 that "for some reason, Aguilera's album is not really one that gets circulated annually when local radio stations go into full-on Christmas mode, even despite reaching number-one on the Billboard Holiday Albums chart". However, some musicians, including Fifth Harmony, have gone on the record praising My Kind of Christmas. In his 2018 Rolling Stone interview Ty Dolla Sign named it "one of the greatest albums ever made". Emily Marcus of Us Weekly ranked it among the top ten best Christmas albums ever and called it an "unforgettable holiday album" that "will always remain an all-time favorite". PopCrush writer Alexandra Capotorto noted that "thanks to [Aguilera's] beautiful pipes, we still believe it's one of the best Christmas albums to impact within the pop genre".

Commercial performance
My Kind of Christmas debuted at number 38 on the Billboard 200 with first week sales of about 25,000. It reached its peak at number 28. It eventually peaked atop the Billboard Holiday Albums. Due to its chart success, the Recording Industry Association of America (RIAA) certified the album platinum, having sold more than 1,015,000 copies in the country.

Track listing

Personnel

 Lead vocals, background vocals – Christina Aguilera, E. Dawk, Dr. John, Kim Johnson, Miari
 Keyboard – Alex Alessandroni, BabyBoy, E. Dawk, The Matrix
 Trumpet – Wayne Bergeron
 Bass – Chuck Berghofer
 Saxophone – Pete Christlieb, Gene Cipriano, Dan Higgins, Sal Lozano
 Drums – Vinnie Colaiuta, Peter Erskine
 Violin – Mario de Leon, Joel Derouin, Assa Drori, Kirstin Fife, Armen Garabedian, Galina Golovin, Agnes Gottschewski, Endre Granat, Lily Ho-Chen, Tiffany Ju, Joe Ketendjian, Johana Krejci, Gary Kuo, Natalie Leggett, Kathleen Lenski, Alan Mautner, Francis Moore, Katia Popov, Barbara Porter
 Guitar – John Goux, Ashley Ingram
 Piano – Dr. John, Tom Ranier, Bob Sanov, Billy Preston
 Trumpet – Warren Luening
 Organ – Myron McKinley, Billy Preston
 Producers – Ron Fair, The Matrix
 Executive producer – Ron Fair
 Engineers – Brad Haehnel, The Matrix, Michael C. Ross, Sol Survivor
 Assistant engineers – Howard Karp, Chris Wonzer
 Mixing – Peter Mokran, Dave Pensado, Michael C. Ross
 Mastering – Eddy Schreyer
 Assistants – Chad Brown, Bobby Butler, Brian Dixon, Tony Flores, Paul Forgues, David Guerrero, Michael Huff, Ed Krautner, Charles Paakkari, Howard Risson, Chris Shepherd, Jason Stasium, Bradley Yost
 Digital editing – Tal Herzberg
 Vocal recording – Michael C. Ross
 Programming – ChakDaddy, The Matrix, Sol Survivor
 Arrangers – Ron Fair, The Matrix, Don Sebesky
 String arrangements – Ron Fair
 Vocal arrangement – ChakDaddy, Eric Dawkins, Ron Fair
 Orchestration – Don Sebesky
 Art direction – Brett Kilroe
 Design – Vivian Ng
 Photography – Norman Jean Roy

Charts

Weekly charts

Year-end charts

Certifications and sales

See also
 List of Billboard Top Holiday Albums number ones of the 2000s

References

Further reading

External links
 My Kind of Christmas at Discogs (list of releases)

Christina Aguilera albums
Albums recorded at Metalworks Studios
Albums produced by the Matrix (production team)
Albums produced by Ron Fair
Christmas albums by American artists
2000 Christmas albums
RCA Records Christmas albums
Dance-pop albums by American artists